Ben Gordon (born January 31, 1985) is an American former professional ice hockey forward.

Career 
Gordon played for the Providence Bruins, Toronto Marlies, Abbotsford Heat, Rochester Americans, Binghamton Senators, and Düsseldorfer EG. He completed his career as a member of the Tulsa Oilers in the Central Hockey League. On October 10, 2014, Gordon retired from his professional playing career, in accepting an assistant coaching role with the College of St. Scholastica in Minnesota.

Career statistics

Awards and honors

References

External links

1985 births
Living people
Abbotsford Heat players
American men's ice hockey left wingers
Binghamton Senators players
Cincinnati Cyclones (ECHL) players
Düsseldorfer EG players
Lincoln Stars players
Minnesota Golden Gophers men's ice hockey players
Providence Bruins players
Reading Royals players
Rochester Americans players
Toronto Marlies players
Tulsa Oilers (1992–present) players
Ice hockey players from Minnesota
People from St. Michael, Minnesota